Sir Rupert Oakley Shoobridge (25 January 1883 – 5 November 1962) was an Australian politician.

He was born in Hobart. He had an extensive political pedigree: his father, Louis Shoobridge, was also a state politician while his mother was the daughter of Sir Philip Fysh, a former Premier of Tasmania. In 1937 he was elected to the Tasmanian Legislative Council as the independent member for Derwent, succeeding his father. Appointed Chair of Committees in 1944, he was elected President of the Council in 1946 and was knighted in 1947. He retired from politics in 1955 and died in Hobart in 1962. His son Louis would also serve in the Legislative Council.

References

1883 births
1962 deaths
Independent members of the Parliament of Tasmania
Members of the Tasmanian Legislative Council
Presidents of the Tasmanian Legislative Council
Australian Knights Bachelor
Politicians from Hobart
Politicians awarded knighthoods
20th-century Australian politicians